The Dream Your Life Away Tour was the first major concert tour by Australian singer and songwriter Vance Joy, in support of his first debut studio album, Dream Your Life Away (2014). The tour began on September 9, 2014, in New York, United States and concluded on March 28, 2015 in Newcastle, Australia.

Background
In November 2013, it was announced that Vance Joy would embark on the tour of the American band Young The Giant as an opening act during the months of April and March 2014, thus marking her first experience giving a shows in North America. During that period, Vance had the opportunity to promote his songs from his EP God Loves You When You're Dancing released on March 22, 2013. Before the tour beginning, Joy performed at several major music festivals, including Meredith Music Festival in Victoria, St Jerome's Laneway Festival in Auckland, Brisbane, Melbourne, Sydney and Fremantle, SXSW Festival in Austin, Groovin' the Moo in Adelaide, Oakbank, Maitland, Canberra, Victoria, Townsville and Bunbury, Bassinthegrass in Darwin, Field Trip Festival in Toronto, Bonnaroo Music Festival in Tennessee, Firefly Music Festival in Dover, 96X Fest in Portsmouth, Glastonbury Festival in Pilton, Splendour in the Grass in Byron Bay, Sonic Lunch in Ann Arbor, Lollapalooza in Chicago, Osheaga Festival in Montreal, Edmonton Folk Music Festival in Edmonton, Outside Lands Music and Arts Festival in San Francisco, CD 102.5 Summerfest in Columbus, Pukkelpop in Hasselt and V Festival in Chelmsford.

On September 5, 2014, Joy released her first studio album Dream Your Life Away. The indie folk album was Joy's first album marketed as indie music. It was a commercial success in Australia, United States, Canada and England, selling over one million copies all over the world. Joy first announced the European dates in January 2014 and that New Zealand singer Ezra Vine would officiate as the opening act. On July 15, 2014, via his Facebook account announced the North American dates, where would the tour begin and it was reported that the American singer Jaymes Young would be the opening act during this stage. On September 2, 2014, Joy announced the dates of he's world tour for Australia. Australian band #1 Dads and Australian singer Airling was announced to be an opening act. The tour was scheduled to begin on March 5, 2015 and end on March 28 of that year.

Critical response
The Dream Your Life Away Tour received positive reviews by critics, praise centered on his vocals and his performance on stage. In a review for Best New Bands, Liz Rowley appreciated Joy's ability to deliver the show, saying: "He is a high-caliber act, extraordinarily talented to boot, and his capacity to seduce an audience is seemingly second nature". Jade Jurewicz, writing for Perth Show, acknowledged "Joy proved he is every bit as talented as he is genuine". Irish Examiner critic Ed Power appreciated Joy's work on stage, writing: "He is enormously impassioned, blessed with a beautifully earthy quaver - and yet, there's an overspill of sincerity in his material that can feel cloying if you're not in the mood". Carry Clancy from There Goes The Fear highlighted that: "Joy created a seamless if predictable set list" and in addition to: "Joy and his bandmates played a tight, well-rehearsed set, but while the songs themselves were exquisitely performed".

Set list
This set list is from the show on October 29, 2014, in Boston. It is not intended to represent all concerts for the tour.

 "Emmylou"
 "Red Eye"
 "Play With Fire"
 "Winds of Change"
 "Georgia"
 "Snaggletooth"
 "My Kind Of Man" 
 "From Afar"
 "Wasted Time"
 "Best That I Can"
 "Riptide"
 "Mess Is Mine"

Shows

Festivals and other miscellaneous performances
This concert was part of the "Festival Pier at Penn's Landing"

Cancelled shows

References

2014 concert tours
2015 concert tours
Vance Joy concert tours